Triptolidenol is a bioactive diterpene created by Tripterygium wilfordii.

References

Diterpenes
Lactones
Epoxides